is a Japanese manga series by author Ken Akamatsu. The story follows Hitoshi Kōbe, a high school guy who isn't good at anything but programming. He creates a program in particular named Program 30 which is that of a female, and is shocked when she comes to life in the real world due to a lightning storm. Hitoshi names her Saati and teaches her about the real world, while she instructs him on how to properly have a girlfriend. Things get more complex however when two more of Hitoshi's programs come to life, and a hacker goes after Saati's program. A.I. Love You was first serialized through Weekly Shōnen Magazine in 1994, but later moved to Magazine Special where it ended in 1997. The series was collected into nine manga volumes that were also released by Kodansha between 1994 and 1997. Two re-releases followed; however, each time a volume was deducted.

In 2003, Tokyopop acquired the license to release the series in North America. The story's title was changed but Tokyopop tried to keep a pun that had been used in the original Japanese title. Eight English language manga volumes were released between February 3, 2004, and April 12, 2005. The volumes were printed until 2009 when Tokyopop announced that the series would go out of print. The English adaptation was well received, and although reviewers pointed out that Akamatsu's artwork was not at the professional level yet, they praised the story and characters.

Volume list

References

External links
A.I. Love You at Kodansha

A.I. Love You